Geraci may refer to:

 Geraci (surname), people and fictional characters with the name
 Geraci Siculo, a comune (municipality) in the Province of Palermo in Sicily